Dougie Wood (born 15 February 1940) is a Scottish former footballer, who played for eleven seasons with Derry City from 1961-1972 in the Irish League. He won six inter-league caps for the Irish League between 1964 and 1967, and won the Irish Cup in 1963/64, the Irish League championship and the Gold Cup in 1964/65. He was the Ulster Footballer of the Year for the 1964/65 season. He also managed the club as player-manager between July 1971 and July 1972.

Wood represented the Boston Rovers in the summer of 1967.

After Shay Keogh resigned as Shamrock Rovers manager in December 1973, Wood (along with Shay Noonan and Dick Giles) took over team affairs for the rest of the 1973/74 season.

Dougie died peacefully at home, aged 82, on 3 June 2022.

References

Scottish footballers
NIFL Premiership players
Ulster Footballers of the Year
Derry City F.C. players
Derry City F.C. managers
Athlone Town A.F.C. players
League of Ireland players
Shamrock Rovers F.C. players
Shamrock Rovers F.C. managers
United Soccer Association players
Boston Rovers players
Expatriate football managers in the Republic of Ireland
Sportspeople from Musselburgh
Living people
1940 births
Association football wing halves
Sunderland A.F.C. players
Raith Rovers F.C. players
Sligo Rovers F.C. players
Linfield F.C. players
Shelbourne F.C. players
Scottish expatriate sportspeople in the United States
Expatriate soccer players in the United States
Scottish expatriate footballers
Scottish football managers
Footballers from East Lothian